Patrick Lencioni (born c. 1965) is an American author of books on business management, particularly in relation to team management. He is best known as the author of The Five Dysfunctions of a Team, a popular business fable that explores work team dynamics and offers solutions to help teams perform better.

In addition to Five Dysfunctions of a Team, he has written eleven other business books: The Advantage: Why Organizational Health Trumps Everything Else in Business; Overcoming the Five Dysfunctions of a Team, Death by Meeting, Silos, Politics and Turf Wars, The Five Temptations of a CEO, The Motive, The Four Obsessions of an Extraordinary Executive, The Three Signs of a Miserable Job, Getting Naked, The Ideal Team Player, and The 6 Types of Working Genius. He has also applied his management techniques to families in The Three Big Questions for a Frantic Family.

The Table Group
Lencioni is president of The Table Group, a management consulting firm specializing in executive team development and organizational health. As a consultant and keynote speaker, he has worked with senior executives and executive teams in organizations ranging from Fortune 500s and high tech start-ups to universities and non-profits. He also gives talks on leadership, organizational change, teamwork and corporate culture. He is frequently interviewed for national media including features in the Wall Street Journal and USA Today. CNN Money listed him in 2008 as one of "10 new gurus you should know". The Wall Street Journal said he is "one of the most in-demand business speakers."

Previously, Lencioni worked at the management consulting firm Bain & Company, Oracle Corporation, and Sybase, where he was VP of Organization Development.

Lencioni grew up in Bakersfield, California. He lives in Alamo, California, in the San Francisco Bay Area. He is married and has four sons.

Books

 Lencioni, Patrick. 1998. The Five Temptations of a CEO: A Leadership Fable. Jossey-Bass. 
 Lencioni, Patrick. 2000. The Four Obsessions of an Extraordinary Executive: A Leadership Fable. Jossey-Bass. 
 Lencioni, Patrick. 2002. The Five Dysfunctions of A Team. Jossey-Bass. 
 Lencioni, Patrick. 2004. Death by Meeting: A Leadership Fable...About Solving the Most Painful Problem in Business. Jossey-Bass. 
 Lencioni, Patrick. 2005. Overcoming the Five Dysfunctions of a Team: A Field Guide for Leaders, Managers, and Facilitators. Jossey-Bass. 
 Lencioni, Patrick. 2006. Silos, Politics and Turf Wars: A Leadership Fable About Destroying the Barriers That Turn Colleagues Into Competitors. Jossey-Bass. 
 Lencioni, Patrick. 2007. The Truth About Employee Engagement: A Fable About Addressing the Three Root Causes of Job Misery (originally titled The Three Signs of a Miserable Job: A fable for managers and their employees). Jossey-Bass. 
 Lencioni, Patrick. 2008. The 3 Big Questions for a Frantic Family: A Leadership Fable... About Restoring Sanity To The Most Important Organization In Your Life. Jossey-Bass. 
 Lencioni, Patrick. 2010. Getting Naked: A Business Fable About Shedding The Three Fears That Sabotage Client Loyalty. Jossey-Bass.  
 Lencioni, Patrick. 2012. The Advantage: Why Organizational Health Trumps Everything Else In Business. Jossey-Bass. 
 Lencioni, Patrick. 2016. The Ideal Team Player: How to Recognize and Cultivate The Three Essential Virtues. Jossey-Bass. 
 Lencioni, Patrick. 2020. The Motive: Why So Many Leaders Abdicate Their Most Important Responsibilities. Jossey-Bass. 
 Lencioni, Patrick. 2022. The 6 Types of Working Genius. Matt Holt Books.

References

External links
 The Table Group
 University of Saint Mary

1965 births
American consultants
American business writers
American male writers
Living people
Writers from the San Francisco Bay Area
People from Bakersfield, California
People from Alamo, California